"If I Let Her Come In" is a single by Canadian country music artist Ray Griff. Released in 1976, it was the second single from his album Ray Griff. The song reached number one on the RPM Country Tracks chart in Canada in April 1976.

Chart performance

References

1976 singles
Ray Griff songs
Songs written by Ray Griff
1976 songs